This is a list of cricketers who were killed during military service. The cricketers are listed by war and divided into those who appeared in Test cricket and those only played first-class cricket.

The conflicts featured on this list are, in chronological order, the Napoleonic Wars, Crimean War, First Boer War, Mahdist War, Second Boer War, World War I, Easter Rising, Irish War of Independence, World War II and the South African Border War. Approximately 210 first-class cricketers are known to have served in the First World War.

Napoleonic Wars (1803–1815)

First-class cricketers

Crimean War (1853–1856)

First-class cricketers

First Boer War (1880–1881)

First-class cricketers

Mahdist War (1881–1899)

First-class cricketers

Second Boer War (1899–1902)

Test cricketers

First-class cricketers

World War I (1914–1918)
275 first-class cricketers were killed on active service during the First World War, including twelve Test cricketers.

Test cricketers

First-class cricketers

Easter Rising (1916)

First-class cricketers

Irish War of Independence (1919–1921)

First-class cricketers

World War II (1939–1945)

Test cricketers

First-class cricketers

South African Border War (1966–1989)

First-class cricketers

See also
 Cricket in World War I
 Cricket in World War II
 List of cricketers who were murdered

References

Killed during military service
Death-related lists
Lists of military personnel
Military personnel killed in World War I
Military personnel killed in World War II
Lists of people killed in World War II
Lists of sportspeople who died in wars